The province of Central Java in Indonesia is divided into kabupaten or regencies which in turn are divided administratively into districts, known as kecamatan.

The districts of Central Java with the regency it falls into are as follows:

Adimulyo, Kebumen
Adipala, Cilacap
Adiwerna, Tegal
Ajibarang, Banyumas
Alian, Kebumen
Ambal, Kebumen
Ambarawa, Semarang
Ampel, Boyolali
Ampelgading, Pemalang
Andong, Boyolali
Argomulyo, Salatiga
Ayah, Kebumen
Bae, Kudus
Bagelen, Purworejo
Baki, Sukoharjo
Balapulang, Tegal
Bancak, Semarang
Bandar, Batang
Bandongan, Magelang
Bandungan, Semarang
Bangsri, Jepara
Banjarejo, Blora
Banjarharjo, Brebes
Banjarmangu, Banjarnegara
Banjarnegara, Banjarnegara
Banjarsari, Surakarta
Bansari, Temanggung
Bantarbolang, Pemalang
Bantarkawung, Brebes
Bantarsari, Cilacap
Banyubiru, Semarang
Banyudono, Boyolali
Banyumanik, Semarang
Banyumas, Banyumas
Banyuputih, Batang
Banyuurip, Purworejo
Batang, Batang
Batangan, Pati
Batealit, Jepara
Batur, Banjarnegara
Baturaden, Banyumas
Baturetno, Wonogiri
Batuwarno, Wonogiri
Bawang, Banjarnegara
Bawang, Batang
Bawen, Semarang
Bayan, Purworejo
Bayat, Klaten
Bejen, Temanggung
Belik, Pemalang
Bendosari, Sukoharjo
Bener, Purworejo
Bergas, Semarang
Binangun, Cilacap
Blado, Batang
Blora, Blora
Bobotsari, Purbalingga
Bodeh, Pemalang
Bogorejo, Blora
Boja, Kendal
Bojong, Pekalongan
Bojong, Tegal
Bojongsari, Purbalingga
Bonang, Demak
Bonorowo, Kebumen
Borobudur, Magelang
Boyolali, Boyolali
Brangsong, Kendal
Brati, Grobogan
Brebes, Brebes
Bringin, Semarang
Bruno, Purworejo
Buaran, Kebumen
Buaran, Pekalongan
Buayan, Kebumen
Bukateja, Purbalingga
Bulakamba, Brebes
Bulu, Rembang
Bulu, Sukoharjo
Bulu, Temanggung
Bulukerto, Wonogiri
Bulupesantren, Kebumen
Bumiayu, Brebes
Bumijawa, Tegal
Butuh, Purworejo
Candimulyo, Magelang
Candiroto, Temanggung
Candisari, Semarang
Cawas, Klaten
Ceper, Klaten
Cepiring, Kendal
Cepogo, Boyolali
Cepu, Blora
Cilacap Selatan, Cilacap
Cilacap Tengah, Cilacap
Cilacap Utara, Cilacap
Cilongok, Banyumas
Cimanggu, Cilacap
Cipari, Cilacap
Cluwak, Pati
Comal, Pemalang
Dawe, Kudus
Dayeuhluhur, Cilacap
Delanggu, Klaten
Demak, Demak
Dempet, Demak
Doro, Pekalongan
Dukuhseti, Pati
Dukuhturi, Tegal
Dukuhwaru, Tegal
Dukun, Magelang
Eromoko, Wonogiri
Gabus, Grobogan
Gabus, Pati
Gajah, Demak
Gajahmungkur, Semarang
Gandrungmangu, Cilacap
Gantiwarno, Klaten
Garung, Wonosobo
Gatak, Sukoharjo
Gayamsari, Semarang
Gebang, Purworejo
Gebog, Kudus
Gemawang, Temanggung
Gembong, Pati
Gemolong, Sragen
Gemuh, Kendal
Genuk, Semarang
Gesi, Sragen
Getasan, Semarang
Geyer, Grobogan
Girimarto, Wonogiri
Giritontro, Wonogiri
Giriwoyo, Wonogiri
Godong, Grobogan
Gombong, Kebumen
Gondang, Sragen
Grabag, Magelang
Grabag, Purworejo
Gringsing, Batang
Grobogan, Grobogan
Grogol, Sukoharjo
Gubug, Grobogan
Gumelar, Banyumas
Gunem, Rembang
Guntur, Demak
Gunungpati, Semarang
Gunungwungkal, Pati
Jaken, Pati
Jakenan, Pati
Jambu, Semarang
Japah, Blora
Jati, Blora
Jati, Kudus
Jatibarang, Brebes
Jatilawang, Banyumas
Jatinegara, Tegal
Jatinom, Klaten
Jatipurno, Wonogiri
Jatiroto, Wonogiri
Jatisrono, Wonogiri
Jebres, Surakarta
Jekulo, Kudus
Jenar, Sragen
Jepara, Jepara
Jepon, Blora
Jeruklegi, Cilacap
Jiken, Blora
Jogonalan, Klaten
Jumo, Temanggung
Juwana, Pati
Juwangi, Boyolali
Juwiring, Klaten
Kajen, Pekalongan
Kajoran, Magelang
Kaliangkrik, Magelang
Kalibagor, Banyumas
Kalibawang, Wonosobo
Kalibening, Banjarnegara
Kaligesing, Purworejo
Kaligondang, Purbalingga
Kalijambe, Sragen
Kalikajar, Wonosobo
Kalikotes, Klaten
Kalimanah, Purbalingga
Kalinyamatan, Jepara
Kaliori, Rembang
Kaliwiro, Wonosobo
Kaliwungu Selatan, Kendal
Kaliwungu, Kendal
Kaliwungu, Kudus
Kaliwungu, Semarang
Kaloran, Temanggung
Kampung Laut, Cilacap
Kandangan, Temanggung
Kandangserang, Pekalongan
Kandeman, Batang
Kangkung, Kendal
Karanganom, Klaten
Karanganyar, Demak
Karanganyar, Kebumen
Karanganyar, Pekalongan
Karanganyar, Purbalingga
Karangawen, Demak
Karangdadap, Pekalongan
Karangdowo, Klaten
Karanggayam, Kebumen
Karanggede, Boyolali
Karangjambu, Purbalingga
Karangkobar, Banjarnegara
Karanglewas, Banyumas
Karangmalang, Sragen
Karangmoncol, Purbalingga
Karangnongko, Klaten
Karangpucung, Cilacap
Karangrayung, Grobogan
Karangreja, Purbalingga
Karangsambung, Kebumen
Karangtengah, Demak
Karangtengah, Wonogiri
Karimunjawa, Jepara
Kartasura, Sukoharjo
Kawunganten, Cilacap
Kayen, Pati
Kebasen, Banyumas
Kebonagung, Demak
Kebonarum, Klaten
Kebumen, Kebumen
Kedawung, Sragen
Kedu, Temanggung
Kedung, Jepara
Kedungbanteng, Banyumas
Kedungbanteng, Tegal
Kedungjati, Grobogan
Kedungreja, Cilacap
Kedungtuban, Blora
Kedungwuni, Pekalongan
Kejajar, Wonosobo
Kejobong, Purbalingga
Keling, Jepara
Kemalang, Klaten
Kemangkon, Purbalingga
Kembang, Jepara
Kembaran, Banyumas
Kemiri, Purworejo
Kemranjen, Banyumas
Kemusu, Boyolali
Kendal, Kendal
Kepil, Wonosobo
Kersana, Brebes
Kertanegara, Purbalingga
Kertek, Wonosobo
Kesesi, Pekalongan
Kesugihan, Cilacap
Ketanggungan, Brebes
Kismantoro, Wonogiri
Klambu, Grobogan
Klaten Selatan, Klaten
Klaten Tengah, Klaten
Klaten Utara, Klaten
Kledung, Temanggung
Klego, Boyolali
Klirong, Kebumen
Kradenan, Blora
Kradenan, Grobogan
Kragan, Rembang
Kramat, Tegal
Kranggan, Temanggung
Kroya, Cilacap
Kudus, Kudus
Kunduran, Blora
Kutasari, Purbalingga
Kutoarjo, Purworejo
Kutowinangun, Kebumen
Kuwarasan, Kebumen
Larangan, Brebes
Lasem, Rembang
Lawiyan, Surakarta
Lebakbarang, Pekalongan
Lebaksiu, Tegal
Leksono, Wonosobo
Limbangan, Kendal
Limpung, Batang
Loano, Purworejo
Losari, Brebes
Lumbir, Banyumas
Madukara, Banjarnegara
Magelang Selatan, Magelang
Magelang Tengah, Magelang
Magelang Utara, Magelang
Majenang, Cilacap
Mandiraja, Banjarnegara
Manisrenggo, Klaten
Manyaran, Wonogiri
Maos, Cilacap
Margadana, Tegal
Margasari, Tegal
Margorejo, Pati
Margoyoso, Pati
Martoyudan, Magelang
Masaran, Sragen
Mayong, Jepara
Mejobo, Kudus
Mijen, Demak
Mijen, Semarang
Miri, Sragen
Mirit, Kebumen
Mlonggo, Jepara
Moga, Pemalang
Mojolaban, Sukoharjo
Mojosongo, Boyolali
Mojotengah, Wonosobo
Mondokan, Sragen
Mranggen, Demak
Mrebet, Purbalingga
Mungkid, Magelang
Muntilan, Magelang
Musuk, Boyolali
Nalumsari, Jepara
Ngablak, Magelang
Ngadirejo, Temanggung
Ngadirojo, Wonogiri
Ngaliyan, Semarang
Ngampel, Kendal
Ngaringan, Grobogan
Ngawen, Blora
Ngawen, Klaten
Ngemplak, Boyolali
Ngluwar, Magelang
Ngombol, Purworejo
Ngrampal, Sragen
Nguntoronadi, Wonogiri
Nguter, Sukoharjo
Nogosari, Boyolali
Nusawungu, Cilacap
Pabelan, Semarang
Padamara, Purbalingga
Padureso, Kebumen
Pagentan, Banjarnegara
Pagerbarang, Tegal
Pagerruyung, Kendal
Paguyangan, Brebes
Pakis, Magelang
Pamotan, Rembang
Pancur, Rembang
Pangkah, Tegal
Paninggaran, Pekalongan
Parakan, Temanggung
Paranggupito, Wonogiri
Pasar Kliwon, Surakarta
Patean, Kendal
Patebon, Kendal
Pati, Pati
Patikraja, Banyumas
Patimuan, Cilacap
Pecalungan, Batang
Pecangaan, Jepara
Pedan, Klaten
Pedurungan, Semarang
Pegandon, Kendal
Pejagoan, Kebumen
Pejawaran, Banjarnegara
Pekalongan Barat, Pekalongan
Pekalongan Selatan, Pekalongan
Pekalongan Timur, Pekalongan
Pekalongan Utara, Pekalongan
Pekuncen, Banyumas
Pemalang, Pemalang
Penawangan, Grobogan
Pengadegan, Purbalingga
Petanahan, Kebumen
Petarukan, Pemalang
Petungkriono, Pekalongan
Pituruh, Purworejo
Plantungan, Kendal
Plupuh, Sragen
Polanharjo, Klaten
Polokarto, Sukoharjo
Poncowarno, Kebumen
Pracimantoro, Wonogiri
Prambanan, Klaten
Prembun, Kebumen
Pringapus, Semarang
Pringsurat, Temanggung
Pucakwangi, Pati
Puhpelem, Wonogiri
Pulokulon, Grobogan
Pulosari, Pemalang
Punggelan, Banjarnegara
Purbalingga, Purbalingga
Puring, Kebumen
Purwanegara, Banjarnegara
Purwantoro, Wonogiri
Purwodadi, Grobogan
Purwodadi, Purworejo
Purwojati, Banyumas
Purwokerto Barat, Banyumas
Purwokerto Selatan, Banyumas
Purwokerto Timur, Banyumas
Purwokerto Utara, Banyumas
Purworejo Klampok, Banjarnegara
Purworejo, Purworejo
Rakit, Banjarnegara
Randublatung, Blora
Randudongkal, Pemalang
Rawakele, Kebumen
Rawalo, Banyumas
Reban, Batang
Rembang, Purbalingga
Rembang, Rembang
Ringinarum, Kendal
Rowokele, Kebumen
Rowosari, Kendal
Sadang, Kebumen
Salam, Magelang
Salaman, Magelang
Salem, Brebes
Sambi, Boyolali
Sambirejo, Sragen
Sambong, Blora
Sambungmacan, Sragen
Sampang, Cilacap
Sapuran, Wonosobo
Sarang, Rembang
Sawangan, Magelang
Sawit, Boyolali
Sayung, Demak
Secang, Magelang
Sedan, Rembang
Selo, Boyolali
Selogiri, Wonogiri
Selomerto, Wonosobo
Selopampang, Temanggung
Semarang Barat, Semarang
Semarang Selatan, Semarang
Semarang Tengah, Semarang
Semarang Timur, Semarang
Semarang Utara, Semarang
Sempor, Kebumen
Serengan, Surakarta
Sidareja, Cilacap
Sidoharjo, Sragen
Sidoharjo, Wonogiri
Sidomukti, Salatiga
Sidorejo, Salatiga
Sigaluh, Banjarnegara
Simo, Boyolali
Singorojo, Kendal
Sirampog, Brebes
Siwalan, Pekalongan
Slawi, Tegal
Slogohimo, Wonogiri
Sluke, Rembang
Sokaraja, Banyumas
Somagede, Banyumas
Songgom, Brebes
Sragen, Sragen
Sragi, Pekalongan
Srumbung, Magelang
Sruweng, Kebumen
Subah, Batang
Sukodono, Sragen
Sukoharjo, Sukoharjo
Sukoharjo, Wonosobo
Sukolilo, Pati
Sukorejo, Kendal
Sulang, Rembang
Sumbang, Banyumas
Sumber, Rembang
Sumberlawang, Sragen
Sumowono, Semarang
Sumpyuh, Banyumas
Suradadi, Tegal
Suruh, Semarang
Susukan, Banjarnegara
Susukan, Semarang
Tahunan, Jepara
Talang, Tegal
Talun, Pekalongan
Taman, Pemalang
Tambak, Banyumas
Tambakromo, Pati
Tangen, Sragen
Tanggungharjo, Grobogan
Tanjung, Brebes
Tanon, Sragen
Tarub, Tegal
Tawangharjo, Grobogan
Tawangsari, Sukoharjo
Tayu, Pati
Tegal Barat, Tegal
Tegal Selatan, Tegal
Tegal Timur, Tegal
Tegalrejo, Magelang
Tegowanu, Grobogan
Temanggung, Temanggung
Tembalang, Semarang
Tembarak, Temanggung
Tempuran, Magelang
Tengaran, Semarang
Teras, Boyolali
Tersono, Batang
Tingkir, Salatiga
Tirto, Pekalongan
Tirtomoyo, Wonogiri
Tlogomulyo, Temanggung
Tlogowungu, Pati
Todanan, Blora
Tonjong, Brebes
Toroh, Grobogan
Trangkil, Pati
Tretep, Temanggung
Trucuk, Klaten
Tugu, Semarang
Tulis, Batang
Tulung, Klaten
Tunjungan, Blora
Tuntang, Semarang
Ulujami, Pemalang
Undaan, Kudus
Ungaran Barat, Semarang
Ungaran Timur, Semarang
Wadaslintang, Wonosobo
Wanadadi, Banjarnegara
Wanareja, Cilacap
Wanasari, Brebes
Wanayasa, Banjarnegara
Wangon, Banyumas
Warungasem, Batang
Warungpring, Pemalang
Warureja, Tegal
Watukumpul, Pemalang
Watumalang, Wonosobo
Wedarijaksa, Pati
Wedi, Klaten
Wedung, Demak
Welahan, Jepara
Weleri, Kendal
Weru, Sukoharjo
Windusari, Magelang
Winong, Pati
Wiradesa, Pekalongan
Wirosari, Grobogan
Wonoboyo, Temanggung
Wonogiri, Wonogiri
Wonokerto, Pekalongan
Wonopringgo, Pekalongan
Wonosalam, Demak
Wonosari, Klaten
Wonosegoro, Boyolali
Wonosobo, Wonosobo
Wonotunggal, Batang
Wuryantoro, Wonogiri

Districts of Central Java
Central Java

id:Kategori:Kecamatan di Jawa Tengah